Muhammadu Ndayako CMG (1884–1962), popularly known as Baba Kudu, is the 9th Etsu Nupe, from 1935 till his death in 1962.

Background 
He was born into 3rd Bida ruling house of Umaru Majigi. He is the son of 6th Etsu Nupe Malam Muhammad Makun who was the son of the 3rd Etsu Nupe, Umaru Majigi. Muhammadu Ndayako is a grand uncle to the 13th Etsu Nupe Yahaya Abubakar.

Etsu Ndayako reigned for 26 years (1935–1962), also as his son the 12th Etsu Nupe Umaru Sanda Ndayako ruled for 28 years, being longest server of the throne.

Notes 

1966 deaths
1884 births
Nigerian Muslims
Nigerian traditional rulers
Emirs of Bida
Etsu Nupe
People from Bida